Jabir Shakir  (born 1987) is an Iraqi football midfielder who plays for Al Shorta.

External links

Goalzz.com

Sportspeople from Baghdad
Iraqi footballers
Iraq international footballers
1987 births
Living people
Al-Shorta SC players
Association football midfielders